The Belmond Hotel Cipriani is a deluxe hotel on the island of Giudecca in Venice, northern Italy. It is reached by hotel launch from St Mark's Square, a five-minute journey across the lagoon. Long considered one of the leading luxury hotels of the world, its room rates begin at USD $1,400 per night.

History
The hotel was opened in 1958 by Giuseppe Cipriani, founder of Harry’s Bar in Venice and inventor of the Bellini cocktail. As well as Giuseppe Cipriani, the partners in the joint company were the three daughters of the 2nd Earl of Iveagh, who provided the financing. The three sisters—Viscountess Boyd of Merton, Lady Honor Svedar and Lady Brigid Guinness—each had a suite designed for themselves and their families. Rooms were decorated with Venetian furnishings, including Murano glass chandeliers, Fortuny fabrics and Venetian artworks.

The hotel achieved instant acclaim. In 1962, the Earl asked Giuseppe Cipriani to rebuild and manage the Hotel Belvedere on his property in Asolo; this was reopened as the Hotel Villa Cipriani. In 1968, some adjoining land was purchased and a 600-meter Olympic-sized swimming pool (the only pool in central Venice) was added among gardens.

In 1976, the Hotel Cipriani was purchased for £900,000 by Sea Containers, which established a leisure division named Orient-Express Hotels Ltd. The hotel subsequently expanded into the adjacent Palazzo Vendramin, a 15th-century palace facing the lagoon and St Mark's Square. A restaurant, Cip's Club, was built on a floating pontoon in the lagoon. In 1990, the adjacent Granaries of the Republic were opened as an event space.

In 2014, the Hotel Cipriani was renamed the Belmond Hotel Cipriani as part of the rebranding of Orient-Express Hotels as Belmond. In April 2014, the hotel opened Oro restaurant, designed by Adam Tihany, which in December 2015 was awarded a Michelin star. George Clooney was married at the hotel.

References

External links 

 

Hotels in Venice
Belmond hotels
Hotels established in 1958
1958 establishments in Italy
20th-century establishments in Venice
Dorsoduro